Loose Lips may refer to:

Loose Lips (column), a newspaper column in Washington City Paper
Loose Lips (TV series), a British former talk show
"Loose Lips", a song on the album Remember That I Love You by Kimya Dawson
 Loose Lips (novel), a novel by Rita Mae Brown

See also
Loose lips sink ships (disambiguation)